The California Hydrogen Highway is a series of hydrogen refueling stations in California. These stations are used to refuel hydrogen vehicles. , there were 42 publicly accessible hydrogen refueling stations in California.

History 
The California Hydrogen Highway Network (CaH2Net) was initiated in April 2004 by Executive Order (EO) S-07-04 under Governor Arnold Schwarzenegger with the purpose of promoting hydrogen refueling stations in California.

In September 2006, California Senate Bill 1505 required 33% of hydrogen to come from renewable energy sources, and other initiatives followed. As of 2007, 25 stations were in operation. Some of these hydrogen fueling stations completed the terms of their government-funded research demonstration project and were decommissioned. In 2012, there were 23 hydrogen fueling stations in California, eight of which were publicly accessible.

In 2013 Governor Brown signed AB 8, a bill to fund $20 million a year for up to 100 stations. , there were 53 publicly accessible hydrogen fueling stations in California (one station in Hawaii was the only other publicly accessible hydrogen station in the US).

See also
Hydrogen highway

References

External links
 California Hydrogen Highway
Station Map click on green counter under map for "open" stations

Road transportation in California
Hydrogen infrastructure